Al Kamil is one of the governorates in Makkah Region, Saudi Arabia.

References 

Populated places in Mecca Province
Governorates of Saudi Arabia